The Laboratory Safety Institute (LSI) is a 501(c)3 non-profit organization based in the United States that supports safety in science education. 
Founded in 1978 by Dr. James Kaufman to provide safety training for secondary school science teachers, LSI has grown to become "An International Center for Health, Safety and Environmental Affairs."

The Laboratory Safety Institute was inspired by an explosion that took place in 1973 at Worcester Polytechnic Institute, where Dr. Kaufman had previously completed postdoctoral work and earned his Ph.D. Two hours after the explosion took place Kaufman arrived at the scene and based on what he saw and being a grad student Kaufman knew that the person who was experimenting was lucky he was not killed. This experience is part of what propelled the establishment of the Laboratory Safety Institute.

Over the past 40 years, the Laboratory Safety Institute has taught courses to more than 100,000 people in 30 countries, spanning 130 different industries, including but not limited to:  research, high-tech, government, medicine, and academia. The goal of LSI's courses is to open the people's eyes with real-life stories that teach unforgettable safety lessons. Additionally, LSI  works with schools and corporations to improve their safety policies and safety programs, reducing injuries (and resulting lawsuits) and helping businesses be OSHA compliant.

The Laboratory Safety institute offers a range of different courses such as: Lab safety short-course, How to be a Better Chemical Hygiene Officer, Safety in Secondary Schools, Developing a more Effective Lab Safety Program and More! Along with courses the Laboratory Safety Institute also hosts webinars, have online courses, and have DVD's you could purchase. Additionally, the Laboratory Safety Institute provides other services such as Chemical Hygiene Review, Lab inspections, Safety Program audits, Leadership seminar for Senior management, Development consultation and/or customized lab safety services. 
 
The Laboratory Safety Institute also has publications that they sell via hardcopy or e-book. As well as posters, safety equipment and audio/video products. 
 
LSI members are science educators and administrators as well as corporate hygiene officers, directors of environmental affairs, chemical handling and storage and waste management personnel. To support individuals, corporations and schools in offering ongoing training, the Laboratory Safety Institute offers memberships with great discounts on our courses. Membership also funds tuition scholarships for secondary school science, art and technology teachers to attend LSI safety short courses and seminars.

LSI publishes articles and newsletters regarding best practices in laboratory safety as well as safety manuals and teaching tools for teachers and laboratory managers.

References

Safety organizations
Science education